Encore at the Blue Note is a 1990 live album by jazz pianist Oscar Peterson.

Track listing
 "Falling in Love with Love" (Lorenz Hart, Richard Rodgers) – 9:25
 "Here's That Rainy Day" (Sonny Burke, Jimmy Van Heusen) – 9:00
 Medley: "Goodbye Old Girl"/"He Has Gone" (Oscar Peterson)/(Peterson) – 13:00
 "The Gentle Waltz" (Peterson) – 8:34
 "Billie's Bounce" (Charlie Parker) – 9:14
 "The More I See You" (Mack Gordon, Harry Warren) – 5:10
 "I Wished on the Moon" (Dorothy Parker, Ralph Rainger) – 8:43
 "Cool Walk" (Peterson) – 10:27

Personnel

Performance
 Oscar Peterson – piano
 Herb Ellis – guitar
 Bobby Durham – drums
 Ray Brown – double bass

Production
 Donald Elfman - liner notes
 Kenneth Harmann - engineer
 Jack Renner - recording engineer
 Robert Woods - producer

References

Oscar Peterson live albums
1990 live albums
Telarc Records live albums
Albums recorded at the Blue Note Jazz Club